Anteros is a Neotropical genus of butterflies of the family Riodinidae.

List of species
Anteros acheus (Stoll, 1781) Suriname, Bolivia, Brazil
Anteros aerosus Stichel, 1924 Guyana, Brazil
Anteros allectus Westwood, 1851 Costa Rica, Colombia, Ecuador, Brazil
Anteros aurigans Gallard & Brévignon, 1989 French Guiana
Anteros bracteata Hewitson, 1867 Brazil
Anteros carausius Westwood, 1851 Mexico, Panama, Ecuador, Venezuela, Bolivia
Anteros chrysoprasta Hewitson, 1867 Panama, Guatemala, Brazil, Peru
Anteros cruentatus Stichel, 1911 Bolivia
Anteros formosus (Cramer, [1777]) Panama, Honduras, Suriname, Bolivia, Colombia, Peru
Anteros gentilis (Rebillard, 1958) Peru
Anteros kupris  Hewitson, 1875 Costa Rica, Colombia, Bolivia, Peru
Anteros lectabilis Stichel, 1909 Brazil
Anteros nubosus Hall & Willmott, 1995 Ecuador
Anteros otho Westwood, 1851 Brazil
Anteros principalis Hopffer, 1874 Colombia, Ecuador, Peru
Anteros renaldus (Stoll, [1790]) Suriname, Panama, Nicaragua, Brazil

References
 Funet

Riodinidae
Riodinidae of South America
Butterfly genera
Taxa named by Jacob Hübner